Greensburg is a town in, and the parish seat of, St. Helena Parish, Louisiana, United States. The population was 718 at the 2010 census. It is part of the Baton Rouge Metropolitan Statistical Area.

Greensburg is one of the oldest towns in Louisiana. It has two 19th-century properties listed on the National Register of Historic Places, the old land office and the old parish jail.

Geography

Climate
The climate in this area is characterized by hot, humid summers and generally mild to cool winters.  According to the Köppen Climate Classification system, Greensburg has a humid subtropical climate, abbreviated "Cfa" on climate maps.

Demographics

As of the 2020 United States census, there were 629 people, 232 households, and 159 families residing in the town.

Education
Greensburg and all of St. Helena Parish are served by the St. Helena Parish School System. Zoned campuses include St. Helena Early Learning Center Elementary (Grades PK-2), St. Helena Art and Technology Academy (Grades 3-6), and St. Helena College and Career Academy (Grades 7-12).

Notable people

 The parents of actor and director Tyler Perry are from Greensburg. In their honor, Perry made Greensburg the birthplace of his most famous character, Madea.
 Stacy Aline Singleton Head, Democratic member of the New Orleans City Council, reared in Greensburg
Doris Lindsey Holland Rhodes, first woman to serve in the Louisiana Legislature, born and lived in Greensburg.
Joseph Dunn, born and reared in Greensburg, was named a Chevalier (Knight) in the French National Order of Merit in 2021 by decree of the French President Emmanuel Macron and was inducted into the Ordre des Francophones d'Amérique by the Québec Ministry of the French Language in 2022.

References

Baton Rouge metropolitan area
Parish seats in Louisiana
Towns in St. Helena Parish, Louisiana
Towns in Louisiana